Athletes from the Palestinian territories, represented by the Palestine Olympic Committee and competing as Palestine, participated in the Olympic Games for the first time at the 1996 Summer Olympics in Atlanta, United States.

Majdi Abu Marahil, age 32, was the flag-bearer.  He was born in Nusseirat refugee camp in the Gaza Strip and competed in the Men's 10,000 meters.  He finished in last place in the 1st round heats.   Ihab Salama, age 21, also represented Palestine in Track and Field.

Athletics

Men

References
Official Olympic Reports

Nations at the 1996 Summer Olympics
1996
Summer Olympics